Aignes is a commune in the Haute-Garonne department in southwestern France.

Geography
The commune is bordered by six other communes: Saint-Léon to the north, Nailloux to the northeast, Montgeard to the east, Calmont to the south, Cintegabelle to the west, and finally by Mauvaisin to the southwest.

Population

See also
Communes of the Haute-Garonne department

References

Communes of Haute-Garonne